Hendecourt-lès-Cagnicourt (literally Hendecourt near Cagnicourt) is a commune in the Pas-de-Calais department in the Hauts-de-France region of France.

Geography

Population

Places of interest
 The church of St. Leger, rebuilt along with the rest of the village, after World War I.
 The Commonwealth War Graves Commission cemeteries.

See also
Communes of the Pas-de-Calais department

References

External links

 Dominion CWGC cemetery at Hendecourt
 Upton Wood CWGC cemetery at Hendecourt

Hendecourtlescagnicourt